The Boeing Model 204 was an American biplane, pusher configuration flying-boat aircraft built by Boeing in 1929. Externally, the 204 looked identical to the Boeing Model 6E, but a number of internal changes, including increasing the passenger capacity to four, gave it a new type certificate and model number.

Development
Construction was started on five aircraft, but only two were completed. The first, designated 204 and the second 204A. A third aircraft was built by a private owner who had bought the three incomplete machines. The 204A was a dual-control version which was later owned by Peter Barnes, who flew it on his private Seattle-Victoria, British Columbia main run.

The C-204 Thunderbird, a modified 204, was the first type produced by Boeing Aircraft of Canada. These had altered wing and tailplane incidence and a reduction in upper wing area.  The prototype was first flown on 30 March 1930, the first of a batch of four. They failed to sell readily, though they were sometimes leased for work. Eventually three were sold. All worked in British Columbia, remaining active until 1939.

Variants
204
Four-seat variant of the Model 6E, one built.

204A
As the Model 204 with dual-control, one built.

C-204 Thunderbird
Four 204s built by Boeing Canada.

Specifications (204)

References

Notes

Bibliography

 Bowers, Peter M. Boeing aircraft since 1916. London: Putnam Aeronautical Books, 1966.

External links

1920s United States aircraft
204
Flying boats
Single-engined pusher aircraft
Biplanes
Aircraft first flown in 1929